The 1986–87 FIBA European Champions Cup was the 30th edition of the FIBA European Champions Cup club competition (now called EuroLeague). The Final was held at the Centre Intercommunal de Glace de Malley in Lausanne, Switzerland, on April 2, 1987. It was won by Tracer Milano, who defeated Maccabi Elite Tel Aviv, by a result of 71–69.

Competition system

 26 teams (European national domestic league champions only), playing in a tournament system, played knock-out rounds on a home and away basis. The aggregate score of both games decided the winner.
 The six remaining teams after the knock-out rounds entered a Semifinal Group Stage, which was played as a round-robin. The final standing was based on individual wins and defeats. In the case of a tie between two or more teams after the group stage, the following criteria were used: 1) number of wins in one-to-one games between the teams; 2) basket average between the teams; 3) general basket average within the group.
 The winner and the runner-up of the Semifinal Group Stage qualified for the final, which was played at a predetermined venue.

Preliminary round

|}

First round

|}

Second round

|}

Semifinal group stage

Final

April 2, Centre Intercommunal de Glace de Malley, Lausanne

|}

Awards

FIBA European Champions Cup Finals Top Scorer
 Lee Johnson ( Maccabi Elite Tel Aviv)

Notes

References

External links
1986–87 FIBA European Champions Cup
1986–87 FIBA European Champions Cup
Champions Cup 1986–87 Line-ups and Stats

FIBA
EuroLeague seasons